The , signed as Route 31, is one of the routes of the Hanshin Expressway system serving the Keihanshin area.

References

External links

Roads in Hyōgo Prefecture
31
2003 establishments in Japan